Varėna District Municipality is a municipality in Alytus County in southern Lithuania.

History 
Along with Vilnius region, a large part of Varėna District Municipality was on the Polish side of not-mutually recognized border during the interwar period. This was mainly due to the strategic Warsaw – Saint Petersburg Railway. Unlike in neighboring regions, where the number of Poles is high, the territories now comprising the municipality always had a Lithuanian majority. The Varėna District, as it was then called, was formed during the Soviet Union, with the small town of Varėna chosen as the capital. Varėna was chosen over the then much larger Senoji Varėna (literally "Old Varėna") as the capital, due to its proximity to a railroad. It only became the center of region in the 1970s when it underwent industrialization under Soviet leadership. During a municipality reform the territory was renamed to Varėna District Municipality and the westernmost parts of it ceded to Druskininkai Municipality.

Geography 
Most of the municipality is covered by forests and swamps, it is the largest and least densely populated municipality of Lithuania. It borders Druskininkai Municipality to the west, Alytus District Municipality to the northwest, Trakai District Municipality to the northeast, and Šalčininkai District Municipality also to the west. To the south it shares a border with Belarus.

The district is in the Nemunas Basin. The Nemunas itself passes by its western edge while the Merkys (with its tributaries Ūla, Grūda, Varėnė) is the main watercourse. There is the largest march in Lithuania the Čepkeliai March which is declared as a strict natural reserve. There are more than 100 lakes. Most of them are small, endorhetic, while some, like Ilgis, Nedingis, Lavysas, Glėbas, are larger. 

68.9% of the district's territory is occupied by forests, mostly, by the Dainava Forest (ancient Hrodna Wood), the largest in the country. There are cerca 40 nature monuments - old pine trees used for beekeeping, some outcrops, unique geological landforms.

The main part of the district is in the Dainava Plain. North-western side is covered by the Dzūkian Highland, while eastern side is in the Eišiškės Plateau where is the highest point of Varėna District Municipality - the Riliškiai Hill (193 m).

 Rivers: Nemunas, Merkys, Ūla, Varėnė, Grūda, Strauja, Katra.
 Lakes and ponds: Ilgis, Nedingis, Lavysas, Glėbas, Grūda Lake, Varėna 1st Reservoir.
 Marches: Čepkeliai March, Pastalikė March.
 Forests: Dainava Forest, Subartonys Forest.
 Protected areas: Dzūkija National Park, Čepkeliai Natural Reserve, Ūla Landscape Sanctuary, Merkys Ichtiological Sanctuary, Pelesa Botanical-Zoological Sanctuary, etc.

Economics 
Tourism is on rise, as Dzūkija National Park is located in the region. Also, forestry, construction materials, textile, food (milk) industry is being developed.

Council 
Varėna district municipality council currently has 25 seats. The last elections took place in December 2002, and the term limit is 4 years.The results of the 2002 elections:
Lithuanian Center Union - 18
Christian Coalition with Algis Kašėta - 2
Social Democratic Party of Lithuania - 2
New Union Social Liberals - 2
Liberal democrat party - 1

Transportation 
The road network is sparse, but a railway connects the district with Vilnius. There are stations in Valkininkai, Matuizos, Varėna, Marcinkonys, and stops in Kalviai, Pamerkiai, Zervynos, Darželiai, Margionys, Kabeliai, Senovė (the last three recently closed after the train route to Hrodna was discontinued).

Seniūnijos (Elderships or Wards) 
The Varėna municipality contains 8 seniūnijos (in English: elderships or wards); the main town or village is listed for each.

  – Jakėnai
  – Kaniava
 Marcinkonys Eldership – Marcinkonys
  – Matuizos
  – Merkinė
  – Valkininkai
  – Varėna
  – Vydeniai

Population

Demography 
Ethnic makeup (2011 census):
Lithuanians - 22967 (90,5%)
Poles - 1612 (6,35%)
Russians - 307 (1,02%)
Belarusians - 237 (0,93%)
Others less than 0,5% each

Largest settlements

Population by locality

Status: M, MST - city, town / K, GST - village / VS - steading

References

External links
Official page of Varena district

 
Municipalities of Alytus County
Municipalities of Lithuania